Icon Water Limited, trading principally as Icon Water, is a water and wastewater public utility that is an Australian Capital Territory-owned corporation. The company provides drinking water and wastewater services to the ACT. Icon Water is also a 50% owner of ActewAGL, a multi-utility provider of electricity and gas services in the ACT and south-east New South Wales. Icon Water Limited is also the owner of Bendora Dam, Corin Dam (further upstream), Cotter Dam (further downstream) and Googong Dam in New South Wales. Water is gravity fed to Canberra via the Bendora Gravity Main and pumped from Googong Dam. Icon Water operates, and maintains 50 service reservoirs, 25 pump stations, 2 water treatment plants, 27 sewage pumping stations, 4 sewage treatments plants, over 3,400 km of sewer pipelines and over 3,400 km of water pipelines.

Icon Water Limited is wholly owned by the Government of the Australian Capital Territory, with the only voting shares being held by the Chief Minister and the Minister for Water, Energy and Emissions Reductions.

History and relevant legislation
The origins of the Icon Water Limited (previously ACTEW Corporation) go back to the Australian Public Service. The Australian Capital Territory Electricity Authority was established in 1962, with functions transferred from the Commonwealth Government to the ACT Government. In 1988 its functions were transferred to the Australian Capital Territory Electricity and Water Authority.

In October 2000 ACTEW Corporation joined with the Australian Gas Light Company (AGL) to form ActewAGL to jointly provide electricity and gas services in the ACT and south-east New South Wales.

In 2000 ACTEW Corporation entered into a contract with ActewAGL for the management and operation of the water and sewerage network of the ACT and surrounding area. The contact was not renewed in June 2012.

On 4 May 2015 ACTEW Corporation was renamed Icon Water Limited. The reasons given for the change were brand confusion with electricity and gas supplier ActewAGL, the name ACTEW no longer being relevant in the company's operations, disconnect between the company's origin and future.

See also

 ActewAGL
 Bendora Dam
 Cotter Dam
 Googong Dam
 Tantangara Dam

References

External links
 

Electric power companies of Australia
Water companies of Australia
Water management in the Australian Capital Territory
Government-owned companies of Australia
Australian companies established in 1995
Energy companies established in 1995